"The Way You Love Me" is a song written by Keith Follesé and Michael Dulaney and recorded by American country music singer Faith Hill. It was released on February 14, 2000, as the second single from her fourth studio album, Breathe (1999). The song spent four weeks at number one on the US Billboard Hot Country Songs chart in May 2000 and peaked at number six on the Billboard Hot 100 in December 2000. Worldwide, the song reached number four in Hungary, number nine in Spain, and number 15 in the United Kingdom. Country music website Wide Open Country ranked it as Hill's seventh-best song.

Composition
"The Way You Love Me" moves at a tempo of 102 beats per minute.  The song is set in the key of C major but is transposed to D major for the pre-chorus and to E major in the chorus and bridge. The song moves in common time, and Hill's vocals span from G3 to B4 in the song. In the pop version of the song, Hill's backing vocals are Auto-Tuned.

Music video
The music video for "The Way You Love Me" was directed by Joseph Kahn. It first aired on television the week of August 21, 2000. The video shows Hill as many different characters, including a mother, police officer, robber, waitress, heiress, and nurse. A remix video was also made using the Love to Infinity remix, featuring Hill as one extra character: a meteorologist. American filmmaker Jeanette McCurdy, who was eight years old at the time, makes a cameo in the remix music video.

Track listings

 US CD and cassette single
 "The Way You Love Me" (radio remix) – 3:31
 "Never Gonna Be Your Lady" – 5:31

 Australian maxi-CD single
 "The Way You Love Me" (Love to Infinity Recall radio edit)
 "The Way You Love Me" (radio remix)
 "Breathe"
 "The Way You Love Me" (Love to Infinity Master Mix Recall)

 European CD and cassette single
 "The Way You Love Me" (Love to Infinity Recall radio edit)
 "The Way You Love Me" (radio remix)

 European maxi-CD single
 "The Way You Love Me" (Love to Infinity radio mix) – 2:56
 "The Way You Love Me" (radio remix) – 3:31
 "Never Gonna Be Your Lady" – 5:31
 "The Way You Love Me" (Love to Infinity Master Mix) – 6:30

Charts

Weekly charts

Year-end charts

Release history

References

1999 songs
2000 singles
Faith Hill songs
Music videos directed by Joseph Kahn
Song recordings produced by Byron Gallimore
Songs written by Keith Follesé
Songs written by Michael Dulaney
Warner Records Nashville singles